A lower limbs venous ultrasonography may refer to:
 Ultrasonography of chronic insufficiency of the legs
 Ultrasonography of deep venous thrombosis